Wolf Pack is an American supernatural teen drama television series created by Jeff Davis for Paramount+, based on the 2004 book of the same name written by Edo van Belkom. The series premiered on Paramount+ on January 26, 2023.

Cast

Main 
 Armani Jackson as Everett Lang
 Bella Shepard as Blake Navarro
 Chloe Rose Robertson as Luna Briggs
 Tyler Lawrence Gray as Harlan Briggs
 Rodrigo Santoro as Garrett Briggs
 Sarah Michelle Gellar as Kristin Ramsey

Recurring 
 Bailey Stender as Phoebe Caldwell
 Chase Liefeld as Baron
 Hollie Bahar as Prisha Ahmad
 Rainer Dawn as Cody Malcolm
 Lanny Joon as Jason Jang
 Rio Mangini as Austin Kirk
 Stella Smith as Tia Patterson
 Zack Nelson as Cyrus Nix
 James Martinez as Roberto Navarro
 Amy Pietz as Kendra Lang
 John L. Adams as David Lang
 Sean Philip Glasgow as Connor Ryan
 Blaise Reyes as Marco
 Maya Reaidy as Samantha Michaels
 Asmaa Galal as Natalia Bitar
 Gideon Emery as Malcolm

Episodes

Production

Development 
In September 2021, it was announced that Jeff Davis was developing a series based on Edo van Belkom's Wolf Pack novels for Paramount+.

In addition to Davis, Joe Genier, Mike Elliott and Karen Gorodetzky serve as executive producers for Capital Arts. Jason Ensler, Sarah Michelle Gellar and Christian Taylor also serve as executive producers. The series was released on January 26, 2023.

During an interview in September 2022, Jeff Davis stated that although Wolf Pack and Teen Wolf use the same Atlanta studio facilities and share part of the backstage crew, as well as both shows involving young werewolves, the two fictional universes are completely separate and the mythology and creatures involved are different.

Casting 
On June 20, 2022, Paramount+ announced that Chloe Rose Robertson, Bella Shepard, Armani Jackson, and Tyler Lawrence Gray had signed on to play the leads of the streamer's upcoming supernatural teen drama series. Sarah Michelle Gellar made a special appearance during the Teen Wolf panel at San Diego Comic-Con on July 21 to announce that she had joined the main cast of the show. On September 14, Rodrigo Santoro was announced to have also joined the main cast.

On October 7, the streamer also announced new recurring cast members for the first season.

Filming 
Principal photography on Wolf Pack began on July 21, 2022, and ran through the middle of November 2022. While the show is set in and around Southern California, the producers chose to film in Atlanta, Georgia, mainly due to that state's generous tax credit program for television production. Working in Georgia can offset the cost of production by as much as 30 percent of the total budget.

Reception 
The review aggregator website Rotten Tomatoes reported a 42% approval rating with an average rating of 4.9/10, based on 26 critic reviews. The website's critics consensus reads, "Genre queen Sarah Michelle Gellar does her best to lead this Wolf Pack, but it isn't enough to salvage a spinoff that doesn't quite sink its teeth deep enough into the source material." Metacritic, which uses a weighted average, assigned a score of 40 out of 100 based on 12 critics, indicating "mixed or average reviews".

In his review for The Guardian, Jack Seale gave 1/5 stars to the first episode of the series, criticizing the wooden acting, nonsensical dialogue, and incomprehensible plot. The review for Variety declared Wolf Packs "biggest selling point was Sarah Michelle Gellar’s return to a supernatural teen drama — but even her performance is wan and lacks impact".

References

External links 

2020s American drama television series
2020s American supernatural television series
2020s American teen drama television series
2023 American television series debuts
English-language television shows
Paramount+ original programming
Television shows based on Canadian novels
Television series about werewolves
Television series about teenagers
Television series based on novels
Television shows filmed in Atlanta
Television shows set in California